The Siemens-Halske Sh 14 was a seven-cylinder air-cooled radial engine for aircraft produced in Germany in the 1920s and 1930s. First run in 1928, it was rated at 93 kW (125 hp).

Applications 
 Albatros L 82
 Ambrosini SAI.3 
 Ambrosini SAI.10
 BFW M.23
 BFW M.29
 BFW M.35
 Blohm & Voss Ha 135
 Bücker Bü 133C Jungmeister
 Command-Aire 3C3-BT
 Doblhoff WNF 342
 Flettner Fl 185
 Flettner Fl 265
 Flettner Fl 282
 Focke-Wulf C.20
 Focke-Wulf C.30 Heuschrecke
 Focke-Wulf Fw 44
 Focke-Wulf Fw 61
 Heinkel He 72
 LWD Szpak
 LWD Zuch
 Nuri Demirağ Nu D.38 
 Prudden XM-1
 Prudden TM-1
 RWD-17W
 Rogozarski SIM-VIII
 Rogozarski SIM-XI
 SIM-II
 VL Viima

Specifications (Bramo Sh 14A-4)

See also
 Continental R-670
 Jacobs R-755
 Warner Scarab

References

 Becker, E. Siemens Jahrbuch 1928: Flugzeugmotoren der Siemens & Halske AG, reproduced on bungartz.nl
 http://www.oldengine.org/members/diesel/Duxford/germaer1.htm

Aircraft air-cooled radial piston engines
Siemens-Halske aircraft engines
1920s aircraft piston engines